The Rattlesnake Creek Bridge brings a Cuming County, Nebraska county road over Rattlesnake Creek, 2.8 miles northwest of Bancroft.  It was built in 1903 and was listed on the National Register of Historic Places in 1992.

The road was gravel-surfaced in 1992.

It is a steel Pratt half-hip pony truss bridge, and the oldest known example of this type designed by the Standard Bridge Company of Omaha and built throughout eastern Nebraska.

It was one of 60 new or rebuilt bridges in a bridge-building program started in 1903 by Cuming County.  The Standard Bridge Company had an annual contract with Cuming, Wayne, Thurston, Stanton, Dodge and Burt counties and built hundreds of half-hip truss bridges during 1900-1920;  this one is the oldest documented example.

In 2019, the bridge was relocated to a hiking trail housed in a West Point, Nebraska nature park, where it remains in use today by foot traffic. Previously, the bridge was placed in a field in rural Cuming County unused.

References

External links

Bridges on the National Register of Historic Places in Nebraska
Bridges completed in 1903
Buildings and structures in Cuming County, Nebraska
Transportation in Cuming County, Nebraska
Steel bridges in the United States
Pratt truss bridges in the United States
Road bridges in Nebraska